Okello Kelo Sam (born December 8, 1969) is a Ugandan musician, actor, and comedian. He is also the founder of Hope North, a secondary school and sanctuary for young victims of the war, in Uganda.

Early life
Okello Kelo Sam grew up in a village located in Northern Uganda raised by his father and his father's three wives. He is the third child of 20 children.

At the age of 16, on his way to school to pick up some test scores, he, and the group of students he was with, were abducted and forced to be part of the Lords Resistance Army. The group of kids were transported to Syria for a gruesome two week basic training. From there, they were split up and brought to various war fronts. About two years later, during a pitched battle, Okello found the opportunity and managed to escape. He managed to hitch a ride to Gulu, where he assumed his family would take shelter. When he did not find them there, Okello went back to his village, finding it an abandoned war zone.

Okello decided to go to the capital, Kampala, where his uncle lived. Okello's uncle gave Okello shelter. Okello stayed in his uncle's two room house along with his uncle's two wives and four children. Okello then did multiple duties such as, washing clothes, carrying water, and cleaning cars to make money and continue his education. He attended Makerere University pursuing a diploma in Performance Arts.

During this time, Okello discovered a dance company called Ndere Troupe and eventually got an interview and was offered to join the company. Through this, Okello's talent as a dancer, musician, actor, choreographer, cultural promoter, trainer, and arts director, became noticed.
While in college, Okello married Marian Lubega and in 1994, they had their first child, Lawino Mieke Marilyn.

In 1998, Okello Sam's younger brother, Godfrey, was abducted during school with a group of 50 other children. Okello lived in hope that one day his brother, too, would escape. That is, until one morning, when Okello discovered gruesome photos in the morning newspaper, of 300 people killed in his home village. This included his brother. To honor is brother, Okello created a modern play based on Ugandan and Acholi storytelling and musical traditions which is called "Forged in Fire".

In his own words,
"... my relatives, my friends, guys I go to school with, and when I got the news, I just broke down. So I get into my car, driving to the north, just doing it out of anger, out of frustration, so many of the people you know have died and you don’t know what else to do. So we kept on driving, driving, driving and I stopped. And an idea came to my mind."

Hope North
Okello Kelo Sam found Hope North in 1998 after his brother's death. Hope North is a school and sanctuary for young victims of the civil war. Hope North assists orphans, refugees, and former child soldiers.

Hope North is accredited as a secondary school with 26 dedicated educators. The school must work with multiple obstacles such as lack of textbooks and no computers. The school has an international arts program, vocal training, and a working farm which is operated by the staff. The staff strive to give children a well-organized education which leads to careers.

Hope North's goal, according to Okello and the educators of Hope North, is to give the children a voice so they can speak up and make a difference.

A teacher at Hope North says, "These are the future leaders. What we do is what they try to copy. So running away from a problem is never a solution."

When Okello was asked why, after all he had been through, he didn't just give up, he replied:
"I will not even think of falling. I will not even think of stopping. Because if we all had a challenge and stopped, then what would happen?"

References

External links
Official Webpage of Hope North

Ugandan musicians
1969 births
Living people